This was a new event in the 2015 ITF Women's Circuit.

The top seeds Chang Kai-chen and Han Xinyun won the inaugural event, defeating wildcards Cao Siqi and Zhou Mingjun in the final, 6–3, 6–2.

Seeds

Draw

References 
 Draw

2015 ITF Women's Circuit